Shakakarte Chhatrapati Shri Shivaji Maharaj yanche Saptaprakaranatmak Charitra, better known as Chitnis Bakhar, is a Marathi language biography of Shivaji, the founder of the Maratha Empire. It was written by Malhar Ramaaao Chitnis, a biographer and historian. His great-grandfather was the "celebrated" chitnis under Shivaji. The biography had been ordered to be written by king Shahu II of Satara, but the work was completed after his death in 1808, during 1810–1811. The author wrote seven bakhars (chronicles) in total, including six biographies of the Maratha kings (chhatrapatis), and a treatise on political diplomacy('Rajniti') which he based on Sanskrit Nitishastras and other old Sanskrit literature.

Chitnis Bakhar is not arranged chronologically, and does not cite any sources. The text glorifies Shivaji with narratives of his early life, but these narratives are not substantiated by other sources. Historian Jadunath Sarkar dismissed it as unreliable for the purposes of history, stating that "the book is incorrect, rambling or pure guess work in many places, with not even the idea of correct chronology." Sir Jadunath Sarkar may also be wrong as it was arguably written by one of the most loyal Chitnis of the Swarajya.

More information about the author of the Chitnis Bakhar 
To learn more about the authors of the Chitnis Bakhar and the Satara Chitnis Family, go to Khando Ballal Chitnis.

References 

1811 non-fiction books
Shivaji
19th-century Indian books
Bakhars
Biographies about royalty
Marathi-language literature